ILW may refer to:

 Industry loss warranty, a type of reinsurance contract used in the insurance industry
 Intermediate-level waste, a type of nuclear waste that contains higher amounts of radioactivity